Petrovision is a professional convention as well as a technocratic event organized by the Society of Petroleum Technologists (SPT), Branch of Petroleum Refining and Petro Chemicals (Discontinued from 2012), Department of petroleum Engineering and technology, Alagappa College of Technology, Anna University, Chennai. It aims at providing a scaffold for burgeoning technologists and engineers to exhibit their innate abilities and inherent talents and also acts as a liaison between them and the delegates from reputed chemical industries.

Alagappa College of Technology

Popularly known as A.C. Tech., Alagappa College of Technology, one of the constituent campus of Anna University along with CEG, Chennai was established on 4 September 1978, as a centre for technological excellence. It is located alongside Central Leather Research Institute (CLRI), Indian Institute of Technology Madras (IIT-M). It offers nine UG, PG, Ph.D. courses on Chemical Engineering, Petroleum Refining and Petrochemicals, Industrial Biotechnology, Ceramic Technology, Textile Technology, Apparel Technology, Food Technology, Pharmaceutical technology and Leather Technology.

Petrovision'10 and Petrovision '11 (previous editions)

Petrovision was started in 2010 as a one-day seminar throwing light upon the recent trends in hydrocarbon processing. In 2011, Petrovision was aggrandized into a two-day technical seminar inclusive of exciting events to encourage the student community. The event was inaugurated by Mr. Venkataramana, director  of operations for Chennai Petroleum Corporation Limited followed by his lecture on "Changing Energy Sources". The important aspect of the event was that it had blended management with technology.

Lectures by Lt. Col. Jitendira Prasad, general manager, Oil and Natural Gas Corporation and chairman for the Chennai Section of Society of Petroleum Engineers; Dr. G.D. Yadhav, vice chancellor, Institute of Chemical Technology and M. Shiva Kumar, director and chief regional coordinator, Petroleum Conservation Research Association added color to the event.

Petrovision'11 covered a wide range of current and emerging issues that are prevalent in the minds of Petroleum Engineers, Petrochemists and researchers in our country. It provided a platform for students, teachers and technocrats to discuss and discover problems and opportunities in production and utilization of Energy.

Petrovision'12

Petrovision '12 was scheduled to be held 19–20 January 2012. It is proposed to have events such as technical seminars, debate, paper presentations, heat exchanger design, quiz, industry defined problems, etc. The seminars were covered by experts from various refineries and reputed chemical industries.

Petrovision'13

As the branch of Petroleum Refining and Petro Chemicals has been discontinued from the year 2012, Petrovision 2013 has been cancelled.

Petrovision'14

Petrovision 2014 for the academic year 2013-2014 is planned to be conducted on February 5, 6, 2014. Following events are proposed by the student chapter and the necessary steps are taken by Ms. Brindha Lakshmi, overall in charge of symposiums, Alagappa College of Technology.
 Technical Quiz
 Paper Presentation
 Poster Presentation
 Working Model
 Workshop
 Beat the clock
 My Industry

Discussion topics
 Coal Gasification Technology
 Refinery and petrochemical plant integration
 Application of computational fluid dynamics
 Polymer recycling]]
 Understanding thermal cracking and hydrocracking differences
 Advanced process control and its application in industries
 Low-carbon economy
 Bottom of the barrel processing

Academic conferences